Dromore may refer to:

Places 
 Dromore, Ontario, Canada
 Dromore (crater), a crater in the Lunae Palus quadrangle of Mars

Northern Ireland
 Dromore, County Down 
 Dromore, County Tyrone

Republic of Ireland
 Dromore, County Clare, townland in the civil parish of Ruan
 Dromore Lough (Clare), a lake in Dromore townland
 Dromore, County Westmeath, townland in the civil parish of Castletownkindalen, Barony of Moycashel
 Dromore West, County Sligo

Other 
 Bishop of Dromore, named for the town in County Down; the pre-Reformation antecedent of:
 Roman Catholic Diocese of Dromore
 Diocese of Down and Dromore, in the Church of Ireland
 Baron Dromore, subsidiary title of Viscount Scudamore in the Peerage of Ireland

See also 
 Dromore Castle (disambiguation)